Sanipalli Gangadhar (born 12 October 1949, in Munimadugu, Anantapur district, Andhra Pradesh is a leader of Indian National Congress from Andhra Pradesh. He served as member of the Lok Sabha representing Hindupur (Lok Sabha constituency). He was elected to 9th, 10th and 12th Lok Sabha.

References

India MPs 1989–1991
People from Anantapur district
1931 births
Living people
Indian National Congress politicians
India MPs 1991–1996
India MPs 1998–1999
Lok Sabha members from Andhra Pradesh
Indian National Congress politicians from Andhra Pradesh